Bill Kennedy's Showtime is the third studio album by When People Were Shorter and Lived Near the Water, released in 1993 by Shimmy Disc.

Track listing

Personnel
Adapted from Bill Kennedy's Showtime liner notes.

When People Were Shorter and Lived Near the Water
 Paul Defilipps – trombone, violin vocals
 David Licht – drums
 Robert Meetsma – cornet, guitar, vocals
 Kim Rancourt – vocals, keyboards
 David Raymer – guitar, vocals
 Dave Rick – bass guitar, guitar
 Chris Xefos – keyboards, vocals

Additional musicians
 Ned Hayden – guitar
 Richard Hell – vocals
 Alicia Svigals – violin
Production and additional personnel
 Greg Calbi – mastering
 Tom Cinoman – photography
 Kramer – production, mixing, bass guitar
 Cal Schenkel – design
 Steve Watson – engineering

Release history

References

External links 
 

1993 albums
When People Were Shorter and Lived Near the Water albums
Albums produced by Kramer (musician)
Shimmy Disc albums